Sageraea laurifolia is a species of plant in the Annonaceae family. It is endemic to India. It is known in Malayalam as കാനക്കൈത(kanakkaita) or മഞ്ഞനാര(mannanara).

References

Annonaceae
Endemic flora of India (region)
Near threatened flora of Asia
Taxonomy articles created by Polbot